Slave insurance in the United States became an increasingly significant industry after the Act Prohibiting Importation of Slaves, a federal law which took effect in 1808, prevented any new slaves from being imported to the U.S. Existing slaves, especially skilled workers, therefore became more valuable, and were often rented out to businesses; slave owners insured against the death or loss of these rented-out slaves. Industries which rented insured skilled slaves from their owners included blacksmithing, carpentry, railroad construction, coal mining, and steamboat operations, and insured rented slaves also included firemen and cooks. Chinese slaves, called "coolies", were also insured.

The subject of slave insurance in the United States has become a matter of historical and legislative interest.  In the history of slavery in the United States, a number of insurance companies wrote policies insuring slave owners against the loss, damage, or death of their slaves.  The fact that a number of insurers continue the businesses that serviced these policies has brought attention to this history.

Attorney Deadria Farmer-Pallmann discovered an 1852 circular that named insurers that serviced some of these policies. National Loan Fund Life Assurance Company distributed a circular entitled. "A Method by Which Slave Owners May Be Protected From Loss" which named The Merchants Bank and The Leather Manufactures Bank as institutions able to pay and adjust claims. Under a typical policy a slave could be insured for $500.00 with an annual premium of about $11.25.

Disclosure legislation
On September 30, 2000, Governor Gray Davis of California signed two bills relating to slave insurance.  One bill was written by former California State Senator Tom Hayden.  The California legislature found that:

The California insurance commissioner has the power to request slave insurance policies from insurance companies doing business in California.

A second bill, which is called UC Slavery Colloquium Bill (SB 111737) allows the University of California the option to hold a conference on the economics of slavery. Important organizations such as Jesse Jackson's Rainbow/PUSH and the NAACP supported these bills.

In California and other states calls have been made to verify any documents that showed profits from slavery on the part of capitalized insurers whose successors remain in existence today.

Part of Governor Davis' Bill included: 13810 The Commissioner shall request and obtain information in the state regarding any records of slave-holder insurance. Next the Commissioner shall obtain the names of any slave holders or slaves described in the insurance records. Also each insurer licensed and doing business in the state must show any insurance policies issued to slave-holders  that provided coverage for damage to or death to their slaves. Last any slaves whose ancestors' owners were compensated for damages by insurers are entitled to full disclosure. Articles 12810, 13811, 13812, 13813 part of the California Code of Regulations,Tile 10, Sections 2393-2398 implement the statute.

While researching coal mining history, an author recently discovered additional information regarding the use of life insurance policies for coal mining slaves.  "These policies provided a risk-free opportunity for the owners to lease slaves; but it was far from risk-free for the slaves who were forced to work in the extremely hazardous conditions of the mines."   Insurance companies even wrote policies on 12-year-old slaves who labored underground in the mines.

See also
Sklavenkasse
Zong massacre

Sources

References

Slavery in the United States
Insurance in the United States
Types of insurance
Economic history of the United States
History of insurance